The 2013 Southern Conference men's soccer season will be the 18th season of men's varsity soccer in the conference. It will be the last season for the Davidson Wildcats, who will leave for the Atlantic 10 Conference. Two other schools, Appalachian State and Georgia Southern, will leave for the Sun Belt Conference in 2014, but both men's soccer teams are expected to remain SoCon affiliates because the Sun Belt only sponsors soccer for women. In fact, it has already been confirmed that Appalachian State will remain in SoCon men's soccer.

The defending regular season and tournament champions are the Elon Phoenix.

Changes from 2012 
 College of Charleston left for the Colonial Athletic Association.

Teams

Stadia and locations

SoCon Tournament 
The format for the 2013 Southern Conference Men's Soccer Tournament will be announced in the Fall of 2013.

Results

References 

 
2013 NCAA Division I men's soccer season